Zhambyl Zhabaev (28 February 1846 — 22 June 1945) was a Soviet and Kazakh traditional folksinger (Kazakh: akyn).

Life 
According to a family legend, his mother, Uldan, gave birth to him near Mt. Zhambyl, close to the headwaters of the Chu River while fleeing an attack on her village. His father, Dzhabay, then named his son after the mountain.

As a boy, Zhambyl learned how to play the dombra and at age 14, left his home to become an aqyn. He learned the art of improvisation from the aqyn Suyunbai Aronuly. Zhambyl sang exclusively in the Kazakh language.

Many patriotic, pro-revolution and pro-Stalin poems and songs were attributed to Zhambyl in the 1930s and were widely circulated in the Soviet Union. 

Jambyl Jabayev died on 22 June 1945, eight months before his 100th birthday. He was buried in Alma-Ata in a garden which he cultivated with his own hands.

The Kazakh city of Taraz was named after Zhambyl from 1938 to 1997. Jambyl Region, in which Taraz is located, still bears his name.

Authorship controversy 
It has been claimed that the authors of Zhambyl's published poems were actually Russian poets, who were officially credited as "translators." 

Poet Andrey Aldan-Semenov claimed that he was the "creator" of Zhambyl, when in 1934, he was given the task by the Communist Party to find an aqyn. Aldan-Semenov found Zhambyl on the recommendation of the collective farm chairman, the only criterion of choice was that the aqyn be poor and have many children and grandchildren. After Aldan-Semenov's arrest, other "translators" wrote Zhambyl's poems.

In a different account, according to the Kazakh journalist Erbol Kurnmanbaev, Zhambyl was an aqyn of his clan, but until 1936 was relatively unknown. In that year, a young talented poet Abilda Tazhibaev "discovered" Zhambyl. He was directed to do this by the First Secretary of the Communist Party of Kazakhstan, Levon Mirzoyan, who wanted to find an aqyn similar to Suleyman Stalsky, the Dagestani poet. Tazhibaev then published the poem "My Country", under Jambyl's name. It was translated into Russian by the poet Pavel Kuznetsov, published in the newspaper "Pravda" and was a success. After that, a group of his "secretaries" - the young Kazakh poets worked under Jambyl's name. In 1941-1943, they were joined by the Russian poet Mark Tarlovsky.

Films 
 1953 — «Джамбул» (Jambyl) film director Efim Dzigan.
 1994 — «Жамбыл: Адамзатың ұлы жыршысы» (Jambyl: The Great Singer of Mankind) documentary film director Kalila Umarov.
2021 - The filming of a new film titled “Zhambyl. A New Era” has started in Kazakhstan. The historical film is being made in honor of the 175th anniversary of the Kazakh poet.

References

External links

Jambyl Jabayev biography at EXPATsite

1846 births
1945 deaths
19th-century Kazakhstani male singers
20th-century Kazakhstani male singers
People from Jambyl Region
Socialist realism writers
Kazakh folk singers
Kazakhstani poets
Soviet male poets
Stalin Prize winners
Recipients of the Order of Lenin
Recipients of the Order of the Red Banner of Labour